Neapoli or Neapolis ('new town/city') may refer to:

Geography

In Greece:
Neapoli, Thessaloniki, a suburb and former municipality of the Thessaloniki Urban Area
Neapoli-Sykies, a municipality of the Thessaloniki Urban Area
Neapoli, Aetolia-Acarnania, a municipality in central Aetolia-Acarnania
Neapoli, Elis, found east of the municipality of Vouprasías
Neapoli, Kavala, a subdivision of Kavala 
Neapoli, Kozani, a town and a municipality in the prefecture of Kozani
Neapoli, Lesbos, found on the island of Lesbos
Neapoli Voion, the main town in the municipality of Voies, Laconia
Neapoli, Crete, municipality in Lasithi, Crete
Neapoli, Athens, neighbourhood on the northwestern foot of the Lycabettus
Neapoli Zarouchleikon,  neighbourhood in the city of Patras, Achaia, Greece. 
Neapolis (Chalcidice), an ancient city on the Pallene isthmus, Chalcidice
Neapolis (Thrace), ancient city of Macedonia, the Neapolis of Acts 16:11 in the Bible, near Neapoli, Kavala

In Italy:
The original Greek name of Naples, Italy
Neapolis (Apulia), an ancient city in Apulia, Italy
Neapolis (Sardinia), an ancient city the ruins of which are found in the comune of Guspini, Province of Medio Campidano, Sardinia, Italy

In Turkey:
Aurelia Neapolis, an ancient town in Caria, a region of Asia Minor in modern-day Turkey
Neapolis (Bosphorus), an ancient town on the Bosphorus, in modern-day Turkey
Neapolis (Caria), an ancient town in Caria, a region of Asia Minor in modern-day Turkey
Neapolis (Ionia), an ancient town in Ionia, a region of Asia Minor in modern-day Turkey
Neapolis (Isauria), an ancient town and bishopric in Isauria, a region of Asia Minor in modern-day Turkey
Neapolis (Paphlagonia), an ancient town in Paphlagonia, a region of Asia Minor in modern-day Turkey
Neapolis (Pisidia), an ancient town and bishopric in Pisidia, a region of Asia Minor in modern-day Turkey
Neapolis (Pontus), an ancient town and Roman colony in Pontus, a region of Asia Minor in modern-day Turkey
Neapolis (Thracian Chersonese), Greek colony in modern Turkey
Neapolis, one of the other names of the Tripolis on the Meander

In other countries:
The old name of Limassol (Lemesos), Cyprus; used in the Byzantine period
Neapoli, Nicosia, a suburb of Nicosia, Cyprus
 Neapolis or Flavia Neapolis, ancient name of Nablus, West Bank
Neapolis (Colchis), town of ancient Colchis, in the Caucasus
Nabeul, Tunisia, originally Neapolis
Mandelieu-la-Napoule, France, originally Neapolis
Scythian Neapolis, Scythian town in modern Ukraine
Neapolis, Alberta, a locality in Mountain View County, Alberta, Canada
Neapolis, Ohio, an unincorporated municipality in Lucas County, Ohio, United States

Football
Neapoli Stadium (Athens), a stadium used by Greek club Ionikos FC
F.C. Neapolis, an Italian football club based in Mugnano di Napoli

Music
Néapolis (album) by Simple Minds

See also
Palaeopolis (disambiguation)